As of 2001, the Metro Detroit area had the U.S.'s second largest Polish ethnic concentration after Chicago. As a whole, Michigan has the second-largest percentage of Polish ancestry of any U.S. state.

History

In the 1880s Polish immigration to Detroit started.

In 1904 the City of Detroit had 13,000 Polish people. By 1925 the number of Polish people increased to 115,000. In the 1910 count of Detroit's population, the Polish population was not distinguished because Poland was not yet independent. Steve Babson, author of Working Detroit: The Making of a Union Town, wrote that "Thus, at least half of the "Germans" counted were probably Poles." After World War I the U.S. government began counting Poles as a separate ethnic group. At that period it was the largest ethnic group in Detroit.

In 1910 the Dodge Brothers opened an automobile plant in Hamtramck. This caused an increase in Polish immigration. By 1920 about 66% of the Hamtramck's residents were Polish-born. Of the remaining residents, most were ethnic Polish. In 1922 Hamtramck became a municipality, electing a Pole as its first mayor. George Tysh of the Metro Times stated that "In the early days of the auto industry, Hamtramck’s population swelled with Poles, so much so that you were more likely to hear Polish spoken on Joseph Campau than any other tongue." For portions of the 20th century the Polish community was centered on Hamtramck and Detroit's Poletown.

A wave of Polish immigrants arrived in the U.S. post-World War II. Poletown in Detroit began losing its Polish population since the 1940s because of construction projects replacing earlier structures and demographic changes. From the late 1960s to the early 1990s a wave of arrivals consisted of refugees, including those who were members of Solidarity, and non-immigrants who had temporary visas. In 1981 the Central Industrial Park (CIP) project destroyed much of Detroit's Poletown.

By the 21st century, the Wayne, Oakland, and Macomb counties formed the center of Michigan's Polish populations. Many Poles had moved from Hamtramck, and Troy became the center of the Polish-American community.

Demographics
As of 2014, Macomb County has almost 4,500 immigrants from Poland and Wayne County has 3,300 immigrants from Poland. Those two counties have the highest numbers of Polish immigration in Metro Detroit.

Politics
In the 20th century, Poles were politically divided among Catholic traditionalists, Polish nationalists, and Socialists. The nationalists advocated for independence of Poland while the Catholic church favored working with the existing German, Russian, and Austrian governments. The Polish National Church had four parishes in Detroit. The church, founded by American Poles, used Polish liturgies and was against social conservatism. The Polish Catholic Union, the socialist Polish Mutual Aid Association, and the pro-independent Polish National Alliance were Polish social programs in the area.

In terms of the political parties, Polish people were most aligned with the Democratic Party.

Social groups
Historically, the Polish had several associations including the Polish Doctors Association, the Society of Polish Engineers, the Polish Lawyers Association, and the Polish Veterans. The latter group, which had a clubhouse, had 25% of its members born in Poland. The members had enlisted in Haller's Polish Army.

Socioeconomic status

According to Ethnic Communities of Greater Detroit, 1970, Poles were "in terms of their occupation, their education, and their income", the "least successful" immigrant group along with the Italians.

Education
As of 2013, Polish is among the most commonly spoken foreign languages in Hamtramck Public Schools. As of the 2008–2009 school year 2.4% of the district's students had Polish as their primary language.

After Hamtramck became a municipality in 1922, every member of the Hamtramck Board of Education was a Pole and most students of the school system were Polish Catholics. In 1925, of the school district's 7,526 students, about 5,400 were ethnic Polish. Half of the ethnic Polish students were non-US citizens. In a period in the 20th century, 8% of HPS teachers were Polish.

Many Polish residents of Detroit in the decade of 1910 did not send their children to Detroit Public Schools. This was partly due to a curriculum introduced in the decade of 1900 that lacked Polish culture and strongly emphasized English language and literature, and partly due to a 1910 IQ testing-based tracking system that had the potential of denying immigrants access to academic programs. In addition many of the new intermediate schools built around 1910 were not accessible to Polish residents. Ethnic Communities of Greater Detroit (1970) stated that in the 20th century, the "proportion of teachers of Polish descent is not so great in Detroit as in Hamtramck". Of the DPS schools, Northeastern High School during a period in the 20th century had the highest levels of Polish teachers, with some Europe-born ethnic Polish faculty.

In the early 20th century, Hamtramck three parishes established grade schools, St. Florian, Our Lady Queen of Apostles, and St. Ladislaus.

In the 20th century, the Institute of Educational Aid, offering biology, citizenship, English, geography, and mathematics courses to adults, was operated by a Polish organization.

Media

Historically WJLB broadcast Polish-language radio programming.

Notable people

 John Dingell 

 John Dingell Sr. 

 Bob Keselowski (Rochester)
 Brad Keselowski (Rochester Hills)
 Brian Keselowski (Rochester Hills)
 Ron Keselowski (Troy)
John Lesinski Sr.
George Sadowski
 Eddie Slovik (Detroit)
Norbert Schemansky (Dearborn)

See also

 St. Florian Church (Hamtramck, Michigan)
 Demographics of Metro Detroit
 History of the Hungarian Americans in Metro Detroit
 History of the Italian Americans in Metro Detroit

References
 Babson, Steve. Working Detroit: The Making of a Union Town. Wayne State University Press, 1986. , 9780814318195.
 Buckowczyk, John J. "The Decline and Fall of a Detroit Neighborhood: Poletown vs. G.M. and the City of Detroit." (Archive) Washington and Lee Law Review, January 1, 1984. Volume 41, Issue 1, Article 5. p. 49-76.
 Feinstein, Otto. Ethnic Communities of Greater Detroit. Monteith College, Wayne State University, 1970.
 Mayer, Albert. Ethnic groups in Detroit, 1951. Wayne University Department of Sociology and Anthropology, 1951.
 Vinyard, JoEllen McNergney. For Faith and Fortune: The Education of Catholic Immigrants in Detroit, 1805-1925. University of Illinois Press, January 1, 1998. , 9780252067075.
 Woodford, Arthur M. This is Detroit, 1701-2001. Wayne State University Press, 2001. , 9780814329146.

Notes

Further reading
 Kowalski, Greg. Hamtramck: The World War II Years. Arcadia Publishing, 2007. , 9780738551418.
 Radzilowski, Thaddeus C. (Ph.D.) "The Polish Experience in Detroit."

External links
 American Polish Cultural Center
 West Side Detroit Polish American Historical Society
 Polish Century Club of Detroit
 Polish Genealogical Society of Michigan

Polish
Polish-American history
Polish-American culture in Metro Detroit
Polish communities in the United States
History of Detroit